The 1998 St Albans City and District Council election took place on 7 May 1998 to elect members of St Albans City and District Council in Hertfordshire, England. One third of the council was up for election and the Liberal Democrats stayed in overall control of the council.

After the election, the composition of the council was:
Liberal Democrats 30
Labour 16
Conservative 11

Election result
The Liberal Democrats were reduced from 39 to 30 councillors, but retained a 3-seat majority on the council. Liberal Democrat losses included losing seats to Labour in Ashley, Cunningham and St Peters wards, while Labour also held Sopwell where Kerry Pollard had stood down after being elected Member of Parliament for St Albans at the 1997 general election. This took Labour to 16 seats, while the Conservatives increased to 11 seats after gaining 5 seats from the Liberal Democrats in Harpenden North, Harpenden South, Harpenden West, St Stephen and Verulam wards, with the majority in Harpenden North only being 23 votes after a recount. Overall turnout at the election was 36%.

Ward results

By-elections

References

1998
1998 English local elections
1990s in Hertfordshire